The Opposite of December... A Season of Separation is the debut full-length album by American metalcore band Poison the Well. It was released on December 14, 1999. Influential in the early popularization of metalcore around the turn of the 21st century, the album was the band's first on Trustkill Records and is now recognized as a landmark album in the genre due to its quality and influence. The album was the band's first release to appear on CMJ's charts, reaching number 9 on the Loud Rock chart in May 2000. The release received numerous reissues on various formats over the years through such record labels as Good Life Recordings, Roadrunner Records, Shock Records and Rise Records and was digitally remastered in 2012.

In promotion of the album, Poison the Well toured the United States several times between December 1999 and September 2001 and also performed a handful of shows in Canada and Belgium. The bands that accompanied Poison the Well on these tours include Stretch Arm Strong, Twelve Tribes, This Day Forward, Brother's Keeper, NORA, Martyr A.D., Candiria, Origin, Cryptopsy, Codeseven, Love Lost but Not Forgotten, Cataract, Curl Up and Die, Eighteen Visions, Unearth, God Forbid and From Autumn to Ashes. Poison the Well also performed at notable festivals like CMJ MusicFest Marathon, in Manhattan, New York, Hellfest in Syracuse, New York (in both 2000 and 2001), Krazy Fest in Louisville, Kentucky, Gainesvillefest in Gainesville, Florida, Monster Fest in Burlington, Vermont, Mixed Messages in Minneapolis, Minnesota, Board Festival in Boston, Massachusetts, Fantasy Festival in Miami, Florida and Good Life Summer Festival in Waregem, Belgium.

The Opposite of December... A Season of Separation's recording session and following promotional tours featured a great deal of member changes for Poison the Well. The album was recorded with vocalist Jeffrey Moreira, bassist Alan Landsman, drummer Christopher Hornbrook and guitarists Ryan Primack and Derek Miller. Former vocalists Duane Hosein and Aryeh Lehrer were both invited to provide backing vocals on a song. Primack quit immediately after the recording was completed and was briefly replaced by José Martinez. During the ensuing tours, Landsman was replaced by a slew of bassists including Michael Gordillo, Javier Van Huss, Albert and finally Iano Dovi, the last of which remained with the band to record their follow-up Tear from the Red. Miller was unable to consistently tour due to school obligations and was periodically substituted by Michael Peters and Matthew Tackett. Moreira also suffered a pneumothorax on the final promotional tour, leading Francis Mark to sing at several shows.

Recording 
Poison the Well recorded the album from October 2–10, 1999, with producer Jeremy Staska at Studio 13 in Deerfield Beach, Florida. The album was recorded with vocalist Jeffrey Moreira, bassist Alan Landsman, drummer Christopher Hornbrook and guitarists Ryan Primack and Derek Miller. The band invited former vocalists Duane Hosein and Aryeh Lehrer to provide backing vocals on the song "Not Within Arms Length", the lyrics of which had been written by Hosein before he left the band in 1998. Immediately after the recording session, lead guitarist Primack quit the band (for the second time) and was replaced by José Martinez.

The Opposite of December... A Season of Separation was initially scheduled to be released solely by Good Life Recordings but the band gained the attention of New Jersey-based record label Trustkill Records, who quickly signed them to a three-release deal (two albums plus one extended play) less than a week after the record was completed. Good Life Recordings retained permission to release the 12" vinyl version of the album, while Trustkill Records released the compact disc version on December 14, 1999.

Primack returned in time for the album release show on December 11, 1999 at Club Q in Davie, Florida, where the band performed with Where Fear and Weapons Meet, Brethren, Red Roses for a Blue Lady, 32/40 and Cho. The band had received the discs from Trustkill Records in time for the release show, but not the artwork or jewel cases. So the band photocopied a special insert labeled the "CD Release Show" edition which was limited to 50 copies.

Release and packaging 
Trustkill Records released the compact disc edition on December 14, 1999, under the catalog number TK27. The artwork and layout was designed by Converge vocalist Jacob Bannon through his graphic design company Atomic! Information Design. The original compact disc release from December 1999 did not feature a barcode on the back cover. It was not until a March 2002 repress that Trustkill Records began adding a barcode to the upper left corner of the back artwork and also on a sealant sticker on the top spine of the jewel case.

Good Life Recordings issued a 12" vinyl version in March 2000 under the catalog number GL052. The vinyl pressing was available on a choice of blue vinyl (limited to 300 copies) and black vinyl (limited to 1000 copies). The blue vinyl was repressed in late 2001 (also limited to 300 copies) at the same time as a repress of Distance Only Makes the Heart Grow Fonder; the second pressing was slightly darker than the first.

In August 2004, Trustkill Records signed a deal with Roadrunner Records for a selection of their releases to be reissued in foreign markets such as the United Kingdom and Europe. Through this licensing deal, Poison the Well's The Opposite of December... A Season of Separation was finally made available locally for those regions. The album was re-released in France, Germany and the Netherlands on October 11, 2004 and in the United Kingdom on October 25, 2004 under catalog number RR8222.

In early 2007, Trustkill Records signed a deal with Shock Records for a selection of their past releases to be distributed in Australasia. Through this distribution deal, The Opposite of December... A Season of Separation was finally made available locally in Australia and New Zealand. The distribution deal originally had Trustkill Records ship a container of already-pressed compact discs to Shock Records for retail marketing through their chain of stores. These American-made compact discs were released to the Australasia market on June 2, 2007 and were identical to the ones sold in the United States. After quickly selling out of the American-made discs, Shock Records began repressing the release directly in Australia as part of the label's series 2 CDs For The Price Of 1. The Opposite of December... A Season of Separation and Tear from the Red were each pressed in separate jewel cases, baring no barcodes on their back covers and both using the same catalog number TK24103. The two jewel cases were packaged together in a slipcase which contained the barcode for retail stores and the catalog number TK24103. The double-disc release was sold as a single unit starting on February 16, 2008. Shock Records simultaneously released seven other packages as part of their 2 CDs For The Price Of 1 series, for Trustkill Records' Terror, Hopesfall, Throwdown, Walls of Jericho, Most Precious Blood and Bleeding Through.

On March 25, 2008, Trustkill Records re-released The Opposite of December... A Season of Separation and Tear from the Red in a special double-LP gatefold packaging under catalog number TK110. Each side of the gatefold cover featured the front artwork of each album (The Opposite of December... A Season of Separation on the front and Tear from the Red on the back). The release was pressed on a choice of blue and red vinyl (limited to 331 copies), white and yellow vinyl (limited to 336 copies), and white and pink vinyl (limited to 661 copies). Trustkill Records simultaneously re-released two other double-LP packages from its past roster: Throwdown's Haymaker / Vendetta and Walls of Jericho's With Devils Amongst Us All / All Hail the Dead.

In 2011, Sumerian Records attempted to purchase a license to reissue The Opposite of December... A Season of Separation and Tear from the Red from Trustkill Records but was unsuccessful. On May 4, 2012, it was revealed that Rise Records had secured the rights to the reissues and would be releasing them in the summer of 2012. Unlike Trustkill Records' 2008 gatefold vinyl repress, Rise Records went to the extent of having all of the audio content remastered and designing a new artwork and layout. The two albums were digitally remastered by Will Putney at The Machine Shop in Hoboken, New Jersey, while the artwork was adapted by merging the two releases' original artworks together. After some delay, Rise Records reissued the 19-song, double-release compilation The Opposite of December... A Season of Separation / Tear from the Red on November 20, 2012 as catalog number RR176. The set was offered in a single compact disc edition packaged in a digipak, a double-LP edition packaged in a gatefold sleeve and digitally through streaming and downloading. The double LP was originally offered on a choice of transparent blue swirl and transparent red swirl (limited to 500 copies), or clear (limited to 1500 copies) vinyl color. A second pressing was done on blue and red starburst colored vinyl (limited to 1000 copies). Rise Records also printed limited edition t-shirts, hoodies and posters in promotion of the reissue.

On January 18, 2020, Poison the Well performed a 20th Anniversary concert in celebration of their debut album The Opposite of December... A Season of Separation. The event took place at the El Rey Theater in Los Angeles, California where the band performed a selection of eight songs from their past releases, followed by The Opposite of December... A Season of Separation in its entirety. The band also re-pressed their debut album on limited edition transparent blue and marbled blue colored vinyl, featuring a revised layout, an expanded commemorative booklet and new liner notes designed by Touché Amoré guitarist Nick Steinhardt. Several mistakes were made while designing the commemorative booklet, such as writing that the album had originally been released on December 14, 2000 (a whole year later than it actually was) and using low-resolution pictures and flyers directly from Instagram and Discogs, at times from shows that were played on tours outside the promotion of the album (shows from before the album was released or from tours promoting later releases). Steinhardt also designed exclusive t-shirts, long sleeve shirts and hoodies for sale at the 20th Anniversary show and as bundles for online orders. The band had anticipated having the vinyl ready in time for their concert but due to pressing plant delays, it was only released on February 21, 2020.

Promotion 
Poison the Well toured vigorously in 2000 to promote their debut album. The band embarked on a local Florida tour with Red Roses for a Blue Lady in late October 1999, followed by an East Coast United States tour with Stretch Arm Strong from December 1999 to January 2000. They also played at festivals like Fantasy Festival in Miami, Florida, Mixed Messages in Minneapolis, Minnesota and Hellfest in Syracuse, New York The band's Hellfest 2K performance was professionally filmed and three songs ("Slice Paper Wrists", "Nerdy" and "Artist's Rendering of Me") were used on Trustkill Records' VHS and DVD Hellfest Syracuse, NY - Summer 2000: The Official Documentary, released on June 12, 2001. The home video also included interviews with Poison the Well and a live performance by metalcore band NORA with whom Primack had played in place of their absent guitarist. The Opposite of December... A Season of Separation was sent in to CMJ in February 2000 and was added to the Loud Rock chart in late April 2000. It reached number 9 on the Loud Rock chart in May 2000.

The band also toured with Twelve Tribes, who was promoting its new extended play Instruments, which featured guest vocals from Moreira on the song "Milk And Mice Pocketknife". The Broken Hearts and Broken Vans - Summer Tour 2000 trip took them across the entire United States, from the Southeast, up the Northeast through the Midwest, covering Central and Southern America, and finally the Westcoast, from June to August 2000. This Day Forward briefly joined the tour for one of the legs. During this tour, Poison the Well opened their shows by performing a snippet of a Metallica cover of "...And Justice for All". Poison the Well and Twelve Tribes were scheduled to play a few Canadian dates as part of the tour at the end of June 2000 but due to lack of paperwork, they were denied entry. Rhythm guitarist Miller was unable to participate in the summer tour so former Twelve Tribes bassist Matthew Tackett filled in during those three months. One highlight event, a radio show performed on June 26 in Boston, Massachusetts, was recorded; two songs from that broadcast were later used as bonus tracks on Undecided Records' re-issue of Distance Only Makes the Heart Grow Fonder in 2001.

Bassist Landsman was kicked out of the band in September 2000 and was replaced by Michael Gordillo who continued to tour with the band in promotion of The Opposite of December... A Season of Separation. On October 20, 2000, Poison the Well performed at the Downtime in Manhattan, New York. The performance was part of CMJ MusicFest Marathon and also featured E.Town Concrete, Diecast, Drowningman, Vision of Disorder, Embodyment, Boiler Room, Colepitz and Lyna. Prior to playing the CMJ event, the band conducted an exclusive live interview on Seton Hall University's radio station WSOU in South Orange, New Jersey.

In November 2000, Poison the Well toured the East Coast with fellow Trustkill Records roster artists Brother's Keeper and NORA. As rhythm guitarist Miller was obligated to finish his school semester, guitarist Michael Peters took his place for the first leg of the tour. The tour passed through Florida for a show at Gainesvillefest in December 2000, where Miller returned, and picked up again with Martyr joining for Southern, Midwest and Canadian dates through January 2001. Poison the Well was however denied entry into Canada, for the second time, again to due lack of necessary paperwork; the band quickly booked replacement shows in the Midwest. 

Poison the Well continued touring for most of 2001 in promotion of The Opposite of December... A Season of Separation. They performed at the Board Festival in Boston, Massachusetts, Hellfest in East Syracuse, New York, Monster Fest in Burlington, Vermont and Krazy Fest 4 in Louisville, Kentucky  They were also scheduled to play the New England Metal and Hardcore Festival in Worcester, Massachusetts, but had to cancel due to touring conflicts as the band was due to be on the west coast at that time Poison the Well had also booked an Asian tour for March 2001, with dates in China and Japan, but due to trouble with the booking agency, the entire trip was cancelled.

In February 2001, Gordillo departed; a month later he was replaced by California-based bassist Javier Van Huss, formerly of the bands Enewetak, Eighteen Visions, Throwdown, Breakneck, Bleeding Through and Wrench. From mid-March to mid-April 2001, Poison the Well toured with Candiria, Origin and Cryptopsy.  The month-long The Pain Cometh Tour took the bands across the entire United States from the Northeast, through the Midwest, the South, Central, the Westcoast and the Northwest. Van Huss left Poison the Well immediately after the tour and the band dropped him off in Orange County, California before making their way back home to Florida. Van Huss went on to play in the bands The Mistake, Black Knot, Extricate, Forwarned and Hurricanrana. Albert joined as Poison the Well's new bassist.

From May through June 2001, Poison the Well mainly played local shows and weekend trips along the east coast with bands like Until the End (which had since then also kicked out vocalist Landsman) and Glasseater. From late June to early July 2001, the band embarked on a mini-tour with Codeseven and Love Lost but Not Forgotten, followed by a few dates with Cataract, Curl Up and Die and Eighteen Visions surrounding their appearance at Hellfest 2001.

In late July 2001, the band played three shows in Belgium, their first time performing in Europe. Poison the Well headlined both nights of the Good Life Summer Festival in Waregem, Belgium, followed by a single show in Koksijde, Belgium The band had originally hopped to do a full European tour but due to previous engagements, notably playing Krazy Fest 4 at the end of July, they were only able to commit to three dates, doing so as a personal favor to Good Life Recordings owner Edward Verhaeghe, who had already released two of their releases. Albert left Poison the Well at the end of July 2001 after performing at Krazy Fest.

Bassist Iano Dovi, formerly of the band Pintsize, joined in August 2001, just in time for a two-week tour with Unearth, God Forbid and Martyr AD across Canada, the Northeast and the Midwest. The tour started out positively, with Trustkill Records ensuring that all of the bands had the proper paperwork to enter Canada legally. After playing their second show in Canada, at Salle X in Montreal, Quebec, Poison the Well's van was broken into and all of their guitars, basses and parts of the drums were stolen. Moreira was so distraught by the theft that he engaged in a screaming fit in the parking lot of Salle X, damaging his throat, which worsened into pneumonia over the next two weeks on the road. After regrouping, the band made arrangements with members of the other bands on the tour to borrow their equipment each night to play shows.

Before the band could drive out of Montreal, their van's transmission died and Poison the Well was forced to stay behind while Unearth, God Forbid and Martyr AD played the rest of the Canadian dates. Poison the Well was only able to rejoin the tour four days later in Wilkes-Barre, Pennsylvania. Starting on September 2, 2001, From Autumn to Ashes joined the tour. That night, the bands performed at CBGB's for From Autumn to Ashes' Too Bad You're Beautiful album-release show. By the end of the tour, Moreira's voice was nearly extinct so From Autumn to Ashes' Francis Mark filled in, supported by members from the touring bands and local opening acts like Ken Susi from Unearth, Joe Sudrovic from From A Second Story Window, Benjamin Perri from From Autumn to Ashes and Charles Johnson from Martyr AD. Upon returning home on September 6, 2001, Moreira was rushed to the hospital where he was treated for a collapsed lung, motivating him to quit smoking cigarettes.

Reception

Accolades 

 Noise Creep Poison the Well's Ryan Primack Flattered by The Opposite of December being considered a landmark album.
 Punktastic "Back on Deck: Poison the Well – 'The Opposite of December'".
 Kill The Music "Retrospective: Poison The Well - The Opposite of December".

Track listing
Credits are adapted from the album's liner notes.

Personnel
Credits are adapted from the album's liner notes.
Poison the Well
Jeffrey Moreira – lead vocals
Ryan Primack – lead guitar (on recording)
José Martinez – lead guitar (credit only)
Derek Miller – rhythm guitar
Alan Landsman – bass guitar
Christopher Hornbrook – drums

Guest musicians
Duane Hosein – backing vocals on "Not Within Arms Length"
Aryeh Lehrer – backing vocals on "Not Within Arms Length"

Production
Ryan Joseph Shaughnessy – live photography
Jacob Bannon – art direction and design at Atomic! Information Design
Jeremy Staska – recording engineer, mixer and producer at Studio 13
Poison the Well – co-producer
Ryan Joseph Shaughnessy – live photography
Jacob Bannon – art direction and design at Atomic! Information Design
Nick Steinhardt – art direction and design at Smog Design (20th Anniversary reissue)

References

1999 debut albums
Albums produced by Jeremy Staska
Albums with cover art by Jacob Bannon
Good Life Recordings albums
Poison the Well (band) albums
Roadrunner Records albums
Rise Records albums
Trustkill Records albums